Under the Palms or  Unter den Palmen  is a 1999 Dutch drama film directed by Miriam Kruishoop.

Cast
Helmut Berger	... 	David
Sheri Hagen	... 	Tanya
Udo Kier	... 	Ludwig
Thom Hoffman	... 	Thomas
Willem Nijholt	... 	Willem

External links 
 

1999 films
1990s Dutch-language films
1999 drama films
Dutch drama films